Virgibacillus byunsanensis is a Gram-variable, endospore-forming, rod-shaped and motile bacterium from the genus of Virgibacillus which has been isolated from sediments from a marine solar saltern from the Yellow Sea in Korea.

References

Bacillaceae
Bacteria described in 2010